Henry Young Darracott Scott RE (2 January 1822 – 16 April 1883) was an English Major-General in the Corps of Royal Engineers, best known for the construction of London's Royal Albert Hall.

Early life

The fourth son of Edward Scott of Plymouth, Devon, and was born there on 2 January 1822. He was educated privately at the Royal Military Academy, Woolwich.

Military career
Scott obtained a commission as second lieutenant in the Royal Engineers on 18 December 1840. After going through the usual course of professional instruction at Chatham he was stationed at Woolwich and Plymouth in succession. Promoted to be first lieutenant on 19 December 1843, he went to Gibraltar in January 1844, where he was acting adjutant of his corps. While at Gibraltar he accompanied Arthur Penrhyn Stanley and his two sisters on a tour in Spain. In 1848 he returned to England, and was appointed assistant instructor in field works at the Royal Military Academy at Woolwich. He was promoted to be second captain on 11 November 1851, in which year he married. He was in the same year appointed senior instructor in field works at the Royal Military Academy.

On 1 April 1855 Scott was promoted to be first captain, and was appointed instructor in surveying at the Royal Engineer establishment at Brompton, Chatham, where he was the close adviser of the commandant, Colonel Henry Drury Harness, in the reorganisation of this army school. At Chatham he had charge of the chemical laboratory, and his experiments enabled him to perfect the selenitic lime which goes by his name. His system of representing ground by horizontal hachures and a scale of shade was perfected at Chatham, and adopted for the army as the basis of military sketching. During his residence at Brompton, Kent, a drought occurred, and he assisted in establishing a waterworks in the Luton valley.

On 19 May 1863 Scott was promoted to be brevet major, and on 5 December of the same year to be regimental lieutenant-colonel.

Commission of the Great Exhibition

On 14 December 1865 he was seconded in his corps, and employed under the commission of the Great Exhibition of 1851 at South Kensington, in the place of Captain Francis Fowke. He gained the confidence of the commissioners, and on the retirement of Sir Henry Cole was appointed secretary to the commission.

The major work by which Scott is remembered was the construction of the Royal Albert Hall at Kensington, with the design and execution of which he was entrusted in 1866. The design of the roof was unique, and there were many predictions that it would fail. Scott, however, never hesitated. When the time arrived, in 1870, for removing the scaffolding which supported the roof, Scott sent every one out of the building, and himself knocked away the final support. The acoustics were a problem. At first there was a decided echo with wind instruments, but the introduction of a "velarium" below the true roof cured the defect. On 20 May 1871 Scott was made a Companion of the Bath (civil division).

On 7 June 1871 Scott was promoted to be brevet colonel, and on 19 August of the same year he retired from the army as an honorary major-general, but continued in his civil appointment at South Kensington. On 3 February 1874 he became an associate of the Institution of Civil Engineers; on 3 June 1875 he was elected a Fellow of the Royal Society, and the same year a member of a select Russian scientific society, on which occasion the tsar presented him with a snuff-box set with diamonds.

Scott was for some years examiner in military topography under the military education department. He was awarded medals for service rendered to the Great Exhibition of London in 1862, the Prussian Exhibition of 1865, the Paris Universal Exhibition of 1867, the annual London International Exhibition of fine arts, industries, and inventions, the Dutch Exhibition of 1877, and the Paris International Exhibition of 1878. He received in 1880 a silver medal from the Society of Arts for a paper entitled 'Suggestions for dealing with the Sewerage of London,’ and the Telford premium for a paper he contributed in the same year, in conjunction with G. R. Redgrave, to the Institution of Civil Engineers, on the 'Manufacture and Testing of Portland Cement.' He had prepared the plans for the completion of the South Kensington Museum, when, in 1882, the treasury, as an economy, abolished his appointment as secretary of the Great Exhibition commissioners. This abrupt termination helped to break down his health. He designed the buildings for the Fisheries Exhibition, but was too ill to attend the opening. He died at his residence, Silverdale, Sydenham, on 16 April 1883, and was buried at Highgate Cemetery.

Works
Scott's life was devoted to public service, and he failed to secure for himself any benefit from his inventions. He contributed to the 'Transactions of the Royal Institute of British Architects' (1857 and 1872) and to the 'Professional Papers of the Corps of Royal Engineers' (new ser. vols. vi, vii, x, xi, xii, xvii, xx) papers chiefly dealing with his discovery of his new cement and the construction of the Albert Hall.

The Wine Society
Scott is also credited with the foundation of the International Exhibition Co-operative Wine Society Limited, which is more commonly referred to simply as The Wine Society. The Wine Society was established in 1874 initially to sell excess wine stocks unsold during the Great Exhibition, and subsequently on the basis of Scott's proposal to set up "a co-operative company" to buy good quality wines on a regular basis to sell to members. He served as The Wine Society's first Treasurer until his death in 1883.

Family

Scott married, on 19 June 1851, at Woolwich, Ellen Selina, youngest daughter of Major-General Bowes of the East India Company's service. She survived him with fifteen children. Scott was the first cousin of the brewer John Edward Scott, father of the Antarctic explorer Robert Falcon Scott.

References

1822 births
1883 deaths
Burials at Highgate Cemetery
Royal Engineers officers
Fellows of the Royal Society
British Army generals
Military personnel from Plymouth, Devon
Graduates of the Royal Military Academy, Woolwich
Cement